The hill pigeon, eastern rock dove, or Turkestan hill dove (Columba rupestris) is a species of bird in the family Columbidae.

Description 
The hill pigeon is a stout-bodied pigeon, similar in size and general appearance to the rock dove but mainly differentiated by its tail pattern which consists of a broad, white tail-band across the black tail. Other differences include a paler mantle and upper wings and a white patch on the back. In flight, the tail pattern is similar to the snow pigeon, but lacks the contrast between the head and neck in that species.

Taxonomy and systematics 
Two subspecies are recognized:
 The blue hill pigeon (C. r. rupestris), described by Pallas, is found in the eastern range of the species' distribution.
 The Turkestan hill pigeon (C. r. turkestanica), described by Buturlin, is found in the western range of the species' distribution.

Distribution and status 
It is found in China, Pakistan, India, Nepal, Kazakhstan, North Korea, South Korea, Mongolia, Russia, Tajikistan, Afghanistan, and Turkmenistan. This pigeon is comparatively restricted in range of Pakistan to the furthest northern inner valleys of the Karakoram, Hindu Kush, and Pamirs. In Pakistan, it occurs in northern Chitral, particularly in the western part bordering Nuristan in Afghanistan, further east in valleys of Gilgit in Yasin and Hunza and Karakoram ranges in Baltistan from about 2000 m in winter up to 5500 m during summer. Though the overall population is decreasing, the rate of decrease is not alarming and the bird is widely distributed and abundant; it is classified as least concern by the IUCN.

Behaviour and ecology 
This species frequents open rugged country from 1,500 to 6,100 m above sea level. They are closely related to rock doves, but more commonly are found at higher altitudes. A gregarious species throughout the year, they feed in flocks in the terraced, cultivated fields. They often mix with flocks of rock doves. They are very tame and are often found near human settlements, camps, and pilgrimage routes.

In Tajikistan, it has been recorded as starting to nest as early as February, with many young just fledging as late as September in northeastern Tibet. The males have a bowing display similar to that of the rock dove and  display and courtship is similar. They nest in dense colonies on cliffs, gorges, and rocky outcrops. In Tibet, the nests are often placed in houses, both inhabited and empty, or in holes in the wall. Nests consist of a platform of twigs or plant stems in which generally two eggs are laid. They may raise two brood in a year.

Their feeding habits are similar to rock doves, being mainly granivorous, supplementing their diet with green shoot and leaves and occasionally small mollusks such as snails. On some occasions, they become very opportunistic, feeding on leftover food, partially digested food from kiang dung, and even undigested food from stomach of kiang carcasses which are ripped open by other predators.

References

External links
 Photos, Videos
 Hill Pigeon Breed Guide - Pigeonpedia

hill pigeon
Birds of China
Birds of the Himalayas
Birds of Central Asia
Birds of Korea
Birds of Tibet
Birds of Yunnan
hill pigeon
Taxonomy articles created by Polbot